Douglas Howard Ginsburg (born May 25, 1946) is an American jurist and academic who serves as a senior judge on the United States Court of Appeals for the District of Columbia Circuit. He was appointed to that court in October 1986 by President Ronald Reagan, and served as its chief judge from July 2001 until February 2008. In October 1987, Reagan announced his intention to nominate Ginsburg as an associate justice of the United States Supreme Court, but withdrew his name from consideration before being formally nominated, after his earlier marijuana use created controversy.

Ginsburg took senior status in October 2011, and joined the faculty of New York University School of Law in January 2012. In 2013, he left NYU and began teaching at George Mason University Scalia Law School. He is the author of numerous scholarly works on antitrust and constitutional law.

Early life and education

Ginsburg was born in Chicago in 1946 to Katherine (née Goodmont) and Maurice Ginsburg. He graduated from the Latin School of Chicago in 1963, then attended Cornell University. After dropping out in 1965 due to "boredom", he invested in and helped run Operation Match, an early computer dating service based in Boston, Massachusetts. Ginsburg returned to Cornell in 1968 after selling the company and graduated with a Bachelor of Science degree in 1970.

Ginsburg then attended the University of Chicago Law School, where he was an editor of the University of Chicago Law Review along with future judge Frank Easterbrook. He graduated in 1973 with a Juris Doctor and membership in the Order of the Coif.

Career
After law school, Ginsburg clerked for Judge Carl E. McGowan on the D.C. Circuit from 1973 to 1974, then for Justice Thurgood Marshall of the U.S. Supreme Court from 1974 to 1975.

After his clerkships, Ginsburg became a professor of law at Harvard Law School. Ginsburg taught at Harvard until 1983, when he joined the administration of U.S. President Ronald Reagan as the administrator of the Office of Information and Regulatory Affairs. He worked in the Reagan administration until 1986, serving as Deputy Assistant Attorney General and Assistant Attorney General in the U.S. Department of Justice's Antitrust Division.

From 1988 to 2008, he was an adjunct professor at the George Mason University School of Law (now Antonin Scalia Law School), where he taught a seminar called "Readings in Legal Thought". Until 2011 he was also a Visiting Lecturer and Charles J. Merriam Scholar at the University of Chicago Law School in Chicago, Illinois.  Ginsburg has been a visiting professor at Columbia University Law School (1987–1988) and a visiting scholar at New York Law School (2006–2008).

Ginsburg is currently a professor at the Scalia Law School. He was previously a visiting professor at University College London Faculty of Laws. He serves on the advisory boards of the Global Antitrust Institute (Chairman), the Jevons Institute for Competition Law and Economics and the Centre for Law, Economics, and Society, both at University College London, Faculty of Laws; Competition Policy International; Journal of Competition Law & Economics; Journal of Law, Economics & Policy; Supreme Court Economic Review; University of Chicago Law Review; and the Harvard Journal of Law & Public Policy.

Federal judicial service

Ginsburg was nominated by President Ronald Reagan on September 23, 1986, to a seat on the United States Court of Appeals for the District of Columbia Circuit vacated by Judge J. Skelly Wright. He was confirmed by the United States Senate on October 8, 1986, and received commission on October 14, 1986. He served as Chief Judge from 2001 to 2008. He assumed senior status on October 14, 2011.

He was a member of the Judicial Conference of the United States, 2001–2008, and previously served on its Budget Committee, 1997–2001, and Committee on Judicial Resources, 1987–1996; American Bar Association, Antitrust Section, Council, 1985–1986 (ex officio), 2000–2003 and 2009–2012 (judicial liaison); Boston University Law School, Visiting Committee, 1994–1997; and University of Chicago Law School, Visiting Committee, 1985–1988.

United States Supreme Court nomination

On October 29, 1987, President Reagan announced his intention to nominate Ginsburg to the Supreme Court of the United States to fill the vacancy created by the retirement of Lewis Powell, which had been announced on June 26. Ginsburg was chosen after the United States Senate, controlled by Democrats, had voted down the nomination of Judge Robert Bork after a highly controversial nomination battle which ended with a 42–58 rejection vote on October 23.

Ginsburg's nomination collapsed for entirely different reasons from Bork's rejection, as he almost immediately came under some fire when NPR's Nina Totenberg revealed that Ginsburg had used marijuana "on a few occasions" during his student days in the 1960s and while an assistant professor at Harvard in the 1970s. It was Ginsburg's continued use of marijuana after graduation and as a professor that made his actions more serious in the minds of many senators and members of the public. Ginsburg was also accused of a financial conflict of interest during his work in the Reagan Administration, but a Department of Justice investigation under the Ethics in Government Act found that allegation baseless in a February 1988 report.

Due to the allegations, Ginsburg withdrew his name from consideration on November 7, and remained on the Court of Appeals, serving as chief judge for most of the 2000s. Anthony Kennedy was then nominated on November 11 and confirmed in early February 1988 as an associate justice of the Supreme Court.

See also
 List of Jewish American jurists
 List of law clerks of the Supreme Court of the United States (Seat 10)

References

External links

 
 University of Chicago Faculty Bio
 George Mason University Faculty Bio Broken link.
 Reagan's Remarks in Nomination to the Supreme Court
 

1946 births
20th-century American judges
21st-century American judges
Administrators of the Office of Information and Regulatory Affairs
20th-century American Jews
American legal scholars
Columbia University faculty
Cornell University alumni
George Mason University School of Law faculty
Harvard University faculty
Judges of the United States Court of Appeals for the D.C. Circuit
Latin School of Chicago alumni
Law clerks of the Supreme Court of the United States
Living people
New York University School of Law faculty
Reagan administration controversies
United States Assistant Attorneys General for the Antitrust Division
United States court of appeals judges appointed by Ronald Reagan
University of Chicago Law School alumni
University of Chicago Law School faculty
21st-century American Jews